Emil Reinberg (born 20 April 1997) is an American tennis player.

Reinberg has a career high ATP singles ranking of 798 achieved on 7 March 2022. He also has a career high ATP doubles ranking of 728 achieved on 1 April 2019.

Reinberg made his ATP main draw debut at the 2017 BB&T Atlanta Open in the doubles draw partnering Jordan Cox.

Reinberg plays college tennis at the University of Georgia.

Challenger and World Tennis Tour Finals

Singles: 1 (0-1)

References

External links

1997 births
Living people
American male tennis players
Tennis players from Atlanta
Georgia Bulldogs tennis players
Tennis people from Georgia (U.S. state)